Fu County or Fuxian is a county in the south of Yan'an City, Shaanxi Province, China.

Administrative divisions
The county is divided into one subdistrict, six towns, and one township. The county's sole subdistrict, is home to the county's administrative offices. These jurisdictions then in turn are divided into 137 administrative villages.

Geography 
The Luo River, as well as the Hulu River both flow through the county.

Climate 

History 
The area of present-day Fu County was a part of both the Xia Dynasty and Shang Dynasty, the earliest dynasties in Chinese history. During the Qin Dynasty, the area was incorporated as Diaoyin County. During the first year of Emperor Sui Yang's rule, the county was reorganized as Fucheng County, which would be changed immediately after his rule in 618 CE to Fu Prefecture. It remained this way for approximately 1,300 years until in 1912, under the rule of the Republic of China, Fu Prefecture was reorganized as Fu County. In 1964, the State Council of the People's Republic of China renamed the county to its current name, Fu County.

Economy

Agriculture 
The county produces a number of agricultural goods, such as apples, tobacco, rice, and a number of animal products. 360,000 mu in Fu County are dedicated to growing apples, producing 507,700 tons of apples as of 2015. The county also grows 12,000 mu of tobacco, and 6,700 mu of rice.

Natural Resources 
Fu County has a number of natural resources, including significant deposits of coal, copper, iron, petroleum, and natural gas. The county reported 62.844 million tons of proven oil reserves, 1.46 billion cubic meters of proven natural gas reserves, and 425 million tons of coal reserves. As of 2015, an oil production plant owned by Yanchang Oilfield produced 188,000 tons of oil, and a plant owned by Sinopec produced 5,175 tons. These two plants combined have 2,591 oil wells, and employ over 400 people. In 2015, the county produced 2.72 million tons of coal.

Education 
The county is served by a total of 70 schools of various types, employing 2,077 full-time staff and an additional 1,714 workers.

Transport

Road transport 

 National Highway 210
 National Highway 309
 G22 Qingdao–Lanzhou Expressway
 G65 Baotou–Maoming Expressway

Rail transport 

Baotou-Xi'an Railway [zh]
Xi'an–Yan'an Railway

References 

County-level divisions of Shaanxi
Yan'an